Sarkesh (also Romanized as Sarkash and Serkesh; also known as Sirkash and Sīrkesh) is a village in Jushin Rural District, Kharvana District, Varzaqan County, East Azerbaijan Province, Iran. At the 2006 census, its population was 224, in 53 families.

References 

Towns and villages in Varzaqan County